This is a list of comedy anime television series, films, OVAs and ONAs.

References

Comedy